Marius Hans Jørgensen (25 December 1889 – 22 April 1955) was a Danish rower. He competed in the men's coxed four event at the 1912 Summer Olympics.

References

External links
 

1889 births
1955 deaths
Danish male rowers
Olympic rowers of Denmark
Rowers at the 1912 Summer Olympics
People from Nyborg
Sportspeople from the Region of Southern Denmark